A. P. Padmanabhan was an Indian civil servant and administrator. He was the administrator of Mahe from 18 June 1984, to 11 December 1988.

References 

 

Administrators of Mahe
Living people
Year of birth missing (living people)